Sinalo Jafta (born 22 December 1994) is a South African cricketer who plays as a wicket-keeper and right-handed batter. She made her Women's One Day International cricket (WODI) debut against New Zealand on 22 October 2016. In April 2019, she was named in South Africa's Women's Twenty20 International (WT20I) squad for their series against Pakistan. She made her WT20I debut for South Africa against Pakistan on 15 May 2019.

In September 2019, she was named in the Devnarain XI squad for the inaugural edition of the Women's T20 Super League in South Africa. In March 2020, she was awarded with a national contract by Cricket South Africa ahead of the 2020–21 season. On 23 July 2020, Jafta was named in South Africa's 24-woman squad to begin training in Pretoria, ahead of their tour to England.

In April 2021, she was named the as captain of the South African Emerging Women's squad that toured Bangladesh. In February 2022, she was named in South Africa's team for the 2022 Women's Cricket World Cup in New Zealand. In June 2022, Jafta was named in South Africa's Women's Test squad for their one-off match against England Women. She made her Test debut on 27 June 2022, for South Africa against England.

In July 2022, she was named in South Africa's team for the cricket tournament at the 2022 Commonwealth Games in Birmingham, England.

References

Further reading

External links
 
 

1994 births
Living people
Cricketers from East London, Eastern Cape
South African women cricketers
South Africa women Test cricketers
South Africa women One Day International cricketers
South Africa women Twenty20 International cricketers
Border women cricketers
North West women cricketers
Western Province women cricketers
Cricketers at the 2022 Commonwealth Games
Commonwealth Games competitors for South Africa
20th-century South African women
21st-century South African women